Saint-Jory-las-Bloux is a commune in the Dordogne department in Nouvelle-Aquitaine in southwestern France.

Geography
The commune is situated on a promontory above the river Isle, on the border of Périgord Blanc and the Périgord Vert. It is a green area, with springs and limestone rocks.

Population

Sights
A château built during the 16th and the 17th centuries.

See also
Communes of the Dordogne department

References

Communes of Dordogne
Arrondissement of Périgueux